Cléguérec is a commune in the Morbihan department of Brittany in north-western France.

Geography

Cléguérec is border by Séglien and Silfiac to the west, by Sainte-Brigitte and Saint-Aignan to the north, by Neulliac to the east and by Malguénac to the south. Historically, the town belongs to Vanetais. The forest of Quénécan extends to the north of the commune. The Breuil du Chêne is the highest hill in the town.

Map

Demographics
Inhabitants of Cléguérec are called in French Cléguérecois.

Breton language
In 2008, 13,85% of children in the commune attended bilingual primary schools.

Gallery

See also
Communes of the Morbihan department
Gaston-Auguste Schweitzer Sculptor of Cléguérec war memorial

References

External links

Official site 

Mayors of Morbihan Association 

Communes of Morbihan